Krépin Diatta (born 25 February 1999) is a Senegalese professional footballer who plays as a winger for Ligue 1 club Monaco and the Senegal national team.

Club career

Sarpsborg 08 
On 26 February 2017, Diatta signed a four-year contract with Sarpsborg 08. On 4 April 2017, he made his Sarpsborg debut in a 3–1 home win against Sogndal, subbing-in, in the 83rd minute for Ole Jørgen Halvorsen. On 26 April 2017, he scored his first goal for the club in a 10–1 win against Division 3 side Drøbak-Frogn, scoring a hat-trick along with teammates Erton Fejzullahu and Jørgen Larsen. On 13 August 2017, he scored his first league goal for Sarpsborg in a 2–2 away draw against Kristiansund, heading in, in the 80th minute from a cross from Halvorsen. He helped Sarpsborg reach the 2017 Norwegian Football Cup Final, scoring 5 goals in the process. Sarpsborg eventually lost 3–2 against Lillestrøm and finished as  runners-up.

Club Brugge 
On 3 January 2018, Diatta signed a four-and-a-half-year contract with Club Brugge KV. On 8 April 2018, he made his Club Brugge debut in a 1–0 away loss against Gent, subbing-in, in the 46th minute for Ahmed Touba. On 22 July 2018, Diatta played in the 2018 Belgian Super Cup, playing 80 minutes until he was subbed-out for Dion Cools. The match eventually ended 2–1 in favour of Club Brugge. On 24 October 2018, Diatta made his UEFA Champions League debut in a 1–1 home draw against AS Monaco, coming on as an injury time substitute for Emmanuel Dennis. On 14 February 2019, he made his UEFA Europa League debut in a 2–1 home win against FC Salzburg in the 2018–19 UEFA Europa League round of 32. On 10 March 2019, he scored his first goal for the club in a 4–0 away win against Eupen, shooting from the left side of the box and into the bottom right corner of the net in the 23rd minute.

Monaco 
On 21 January 2021, Diatta joined Ligue 1 side Monaco in a deal running until 2025. He scored his first European goal for Monaco against Sturm Graz with a header in a win in the group stage of the Europa League. On 19 November 2021, he scored his first league goal in Ligue 1 of the season against Lille. During the match, he suffered an injury of the anterior cruciate ligament of the left knee.

International career

Under-20
Diatta was part of the Senegal U20s who participated in the 2017 Africa U-20 Cup of Nations. He scored two goals in the tournament, both of which came in the group stage his first a 70th minute header against South Africa in a 7 goal thriller, and his second, a goal in the added time of the first half against Cameroon. Senegal eventually lost 2–0 against Zambia in the final and finished runners-up. They thus qualified for the 2017 FIFA U-20 World Cup. Diatta was part of the Senegal U20s who participated in the 2017 FIFA U-20 World Cup in South Korea. On 22 May 2017, he played in Senegal's 2–0 opening match win against Saudi Arabia. Senegal were knocked out of the tournament in the round of 16 after they lost 1–0 against Mexico.

Senior
In March 2019 Diatta was one of four young Senegalese players to receive a debut call-up to the national team. On 23 March 2019, he made his national team debut in a 2–0 win against Madagascar in the 2019 Africa Cup of Nations qualifiers. On 13 June 2019, he was named in Senegal's 23-man squad for the 2019 Africa Cup of Nations in Egypt. On 23 June 2019, he scored his first-ever senior international goal in Senegal's 2–0 opening match win against Tanzania, scoring in the 64th minute from a 20-yard first time finish, after a corner had not been cleared properly seconds earlier. For his performance, Diatta was named the Best Young Player of the tournament.

Career statistics

Club

International

Scores and results list Senegal's goal tally first, score column indicates score after each Diatta goal.

Honours
Club Brugge
Belgian First Division A: 2017–18, 2019–20
Belgian Super Cup: 2018

Individual
Africa U-20 Cup of Nations Best XI: 2017
Eliteserien Breakthrough of the Year: 2017 
Best Young Player in African Cup of Nations 2019

References

External links

 Profile at the AS Monaco FC website

1999 births
Living people
Association football midfielders
Senegalese footballers
Senegal international footballers
Eliteserien players
Belgian Pro League players
Sarpsborg 08 FF players
Club Brugge KV players
AS Monaco FC players
Senegalese expatriate footballers
Expatriate footballers in Norway
Expatriate footballers in Belgium
Expatriate footballers in Monaco
Senegalese expatriate sportspeople in Norway
Senegalese expatriate sportspeople in Belgium
Senegalese expatriate sportspeople in Monaco
2019 Africa Cup of Nations players
2022 FIFA World Cup players